The following lists events that have happened in 1872 in Iran.

Incumbents
 Monarch: Naser al-Din Shah Qajar

Births
 June 21 – Mohammad Ali Shah Qajar is born in Tabriz.

References

 
Iran
Years of the 19th century in Iran
1870s in Iran
Iran